Autosticha solomonensis is a moth in the family Autostichidae. It was described by John David Bradley in 1957. It is found on Rennell Island in the Solomon Islands.

References

Moths described in 1957
Autosticha
Moths of Oceania